The Treaty of Bucharest of 1916 was signed between Romania and the Entente Powers on 4 (Old Style)/17 (New Style) August 1916 in Bucharest. The treaty stipulated the conditions under which Romania agreed to join the war on the side of the Entente, particularly territorial promises in Austria-Hungary. The signatories bound themselves to keep secret the contents of the treaty until a general peace was concluded.

Negotiations 
In 1915 Lieutenant-Colonel Christopher Thomson, a fluent French speaker, was sent to Bucharest as British military attaché on Kitchener's initiative to bring Romania into the war. But when there he quickly formed the view that an unprepared and ill-armed Romania facing a war on three fronts against Austria-Hungary, Turkey and Bulgaria would be a liability not an asset to the allies. This view was brushed aside by Whitehall and he signed (with foreboding) a Military Convention with Romania on 13 August 1916. Thompson became head of the British Military Mission.

Terms

The treaty had two parts: a political treaty (seven articles) and a military convention (seventeen articles). The Romanian government was to declare war on Austria-Hungary, in accordance with the stipulations in the military convention, on August 28 (new style) the latest, according to the political treaty. In exchange, it was to receive the following territories: 

 Transylvania, Crișana and Maramureș, territories ruled by Hungary, but with an ethnic Romanian majority and Hungarian and German minorities, with its western border reaching the Tisza river.
 The whole Banat territory ruled by Hungary, with a mixed Romanian (37.42 %), German (24.50 %), Serbian (17.97 %) and Hungarian (15.31 %) population.
 Most of Bukovina (the whole region except the part north of the Pruth river), the territory ruled by Austria, with a Romanian majority population.

The exact borders stipulated by the treaty were those of prewar Romania (Article I) and those it was allowed to annex from Austria-Hungary, up to a line of demarcation described in Article IV:

In Article IV Romania also bound itself not to construct fortifications opposite Belgrade and to indemnify Serbs from Banat for their properties if they emigrated from Romania in the two years following the conclusion of peace.

In Article V of the political convention, the signatories promised not to make separate peace and also bound Great Britain, France, Italy and Russia to let Romania annex the territories from Article IV at an eventual Peace Treaty. The Entente also guaranteed Romania equal rights with its allies at the Peace Conference in Article VI of the political treaty. Article VII bound the signatories to maintaining secrecy of the convention until a general peace was signed. 

The military convention stated that Romania was to attack Austria-Hungary from the south while Russia committed itself to start an offensive on the Austrian front to support the Romanian advance into Transylvania. Also, the Russian High Command promised to send two infantry divisions and one cavalry division into Dobruja to protect the rear of the front from a Bulgarian attack. The French and the British pledged to start an offensive on the Thessaloniki front in order to force Bulgaria out of the war.

Romania in the war

In the morning of 27 August 1916 (14 August O.S.), a Crown Council was held at the Cotroceni Palace, convened by King Ferdinand, which decided to honor the treaty with the Entente Powers. On that day, Romania declared war on Austria-Hungary, and launched three armies of 440,000 men the same night across the passes of the Southern and Eastern Carpathians.

The advance of the Romanian Army was initially unopposed, as Austria-Hungary had not stationed considerable forces along the Romanian border. By mid-September, however, the attack was halted, with German, Bulgarian and Turkish troops advancing into Dobruja and threatening to outflank the Romanian Army from the south-east.

By October, the Romanian Army was pushed out of Transylvania with the help of German reinforcements, and by the end of 1916 the capital Bucharest had fallen, along with Wallachia and Dobruja, under the control of the Central Powers, while the Romanian government retreated to Iași. Thompson, now head of the British Military Mission, had to alleviate the consequences of Romania's capitulation, and he personally supervised the destruction of the Romanian oil wells to deny them to Germany.

In 1917, the Romanian Army recovered and succeeded in stopping German attempts to break the front, in spite of the disintegration of the Russian Army after the February Revolution. The exit of Russia from the war in March 1918 with the Treaty of Brest-Litovsk left Romania alone in Eastern Europe, and a peace treaty between Romania and the Central Powers (Treaty of Bucharest (1918)) was negotiated in May 1918. The toll of the campaign was approximately 220,000 dead for Romania, but in the end it gained Transylvania, two-thirds of the Banat, Bukovina, and Bessarabia.

Gallery

References

Great Union (Romania)
Treaties concluded in 1916
Treaties entered into force in 1916
Austria-Hungary in World War I
History of Bucharest
Military alliances involving the United Kingdom
Military alliances involving Romania
Military alliances involving Russia
Military alliances involving France
Military alliances involving Italy
World War I treaties
Secret treaties
20th-century military alliances
Treaties of the French Third Republic
Treaties of the Kingdom of Italy (1861–1946)
Treaties of the Kingdom of Romania
Treaties of the Russian Empire
Treaties of the United Kingdom (1801–1922)
France–Romania relations
Italy–Romania relations
Romania–Russia relations
Romania–United Kingdom relations
1916 in Romania
Romania in World War I